Kleine Emscher is a river of North Rhine-Westphalia, Germany. The former lower course of the Emscher, it flows into the Rhine near Duisburg-Walsum.

See also
List of rivers of North Rhine-Westphalia

References

Rivers of North Rhine-Westphalia
Rivers of Germany